Zhuang Yong (born August 10, 1972, in Shanghai) is a retired freestyle swimmer from China, whose best performance was winning the gold medal in the 100 m freestyle at the 1992 Summer Olympics in Barcelona, Spain. It was China's first gold medal in swimming. Four years earlier in Seoul she won China's first ever Olympic medal in swimming, ending up second in the final of the Women's 100 m Freestyle, behind East Germany's Kristin Otto.

High performances
1985 – National Junior Games
 Winning three golds and three silvers
1987 – National Games
 Gold – 100 m Freestyle (56.22, Asian best and 10th world best result of the year)
 1987 – Pan Pacific Swimming Championships
Silver – 4x100 m Freestyle Relay
 1988 – National Championships
 5th World Best Result of the Year
 1988 – Seoul Olympic Games
 Silver – 100 m Freestyle (55.47, Asian best and China's first Olympic medal in swimming)
 Fourth place – 4x100 m Freestyle Relay
 1989 – Pan Pacific Swimming Championships
 Gold – 100 m Freestyle (breaking ARs in 100 m and 200 m Freestyle)
 1990 – Asian Games
 Gold – 100 m Freestyle (55.30)
 Gold – 200 m Freestyle (2:01.43)
 Gold – 4x100 m Freestyle Relay (3:46.39)
 Gold – 4x100 m Medley Relay (4:11.74 )
 1991 – World Championships
 Gold – 50 m Freestyle
 Bronze – 100 m Freestyle
 Sixth place – 200 m Freestyle (AR)
 1992 – Barcelona Olympic Games
 Gold – 100 m Freestyle (OR)
 Silver – 50 m Freestyle
 Silver – 4x100 m Freestyle Relay
1993 – National Games
 One gold, one silver and one bronze

Honours
1985 – Awarded the title of Master of Sports
1988 – Awarded the title of International Master of Sports
1987-1988 – Selected one of National Top Ten Swimmers
1988-1990 – Thrice Selected one of National Top Ten Athletes of the year
1990 – Named National "March 8th" Red-Banner Holder by the All-China Women's Federation
1994 – Voted one of 45 Sports Stars in 45 years since the founding of new China in 1949

References

External links
 Profile on Chinese NOC

1972 births
Living people
Olympic gold medalists for China
Olympic silver medalists for China
Olympic swimmers of China
Swimmers from Shanghai
Swimmers at the 1988 Summer Olympics
Swimmers at the 1992 Summer Olympics
Chinese female freestyle swimmers
World Aquatics Championships medalists in swimming
Asian Games medalists in swimming
Swimmers at the 1990 Asian Games
Medalists at the 1992 Summer Olympics
Medalists at the 1988 Summer Olympics
Olympic gold medalists in swimming
Olympic silver medalists in swimming
Universiade medalists in swimming
Asian Games gold medalists for China
Medalists at the 1990 Asian Games
Universiade gold medalists for China
Universiade silver medalists for China
Medalists at the 1991 Summer Universiade